Sharfstein is a surname and can refer to:

Zelig Sharfstein (1928–2008), American Chabad rabbi and Chief Rabbi of Vaad Ho'ir of Cincinnati 
Steven Sharfstein (born 1942), American psychiatrist and past president of the American Psychiatric Association
Joshua Sharfstein (born 1969), American physician and former principal deputy commissioner of the U.S. Food and Drug Administration